Gorely is a volcano located in the southern part of the Kamchatka Peninsula, Russia. It consists of five overlapping stratovolcanoes and is one of the most active in southern Kamchatka.
Gorely is a large, long-lived shield-type volcano that is currently in an eruptive phase.  Prior eruptions occurred in 1980-81 and 1984–86.Several complexes compose the overall volcanic structure:
- ancient Pra-Gorely volcano which measures 20–25 km in diameter;
- a 12 km diameter caldera;
- thick stratum of ignimbrites totaling a volume of 100 km3;
- post-caldera eruption cinder cones;
- modern edifice – “Young Gorely” composed of three large superimposed cones and 11 associated craters forming a NW-SE trending intra-caldera ridgeline;
- a complex of 40 modern subsidiary cones on the slopes of  “Young Gorely”.

In 2010, activity began to increase, suggesting the volcano was waking up. A new vent was discovered on the inner southeast wall of the crater

See also
 List of volcanoes in Russia
 Kamchatka Volcanic Eruption Response Team

References 

 
 KVERT

Active volcanoes
Volcanoes of the Kamchatka Peninsula
Calderas of Russia
Stratovolcanoes of Russia
Mountains of the Kamchatka Peninsula
Holocene stratovolcanoes
Holocene Asia